Mustapha Bouchina (born 10 August 1991) is an Algerian footballer who plays for USM Alger in the Algerian Ligue Professionnelle 1.

Career
From 2013 to 2020, Bouchina played for Paradou AC.

In 2020, he signed a two-year contract with USM Alger.

References

External links
 

1991 births
Living people
Algerian footballers
Association football defenders
Paradou AC players
Algerian Ligue Professionnelle 1 players
People from Algiers Province
21st-century Algerian people